Little Black Book may refer to:

 An address book, particularly one containing the names of past or potential romantic or sexual partners
 Little Black Book, an annual feature of the Tatler, a British magazine
 The 97-page book of contacts by Jeffrey Epstein
 Little Black Book (film), a 2004 comedy film
 "Little Black Book" (song), by Belinda Carlisle
 "Little Black Book", a 1962 song by Jimmy Dean
 "The Little Black Book: Part 1" and "Part 2", a 1968 two-part episode of Get Smart

See also
Black Book (disambiguation)